DAR Motion Pictures (DAR), a wholly owned subsidiary of DAR Capital Group, is an Indian film production and distribution company headquartered out of Mumbai. Known for its focus on content driven cinema, DAR Motion Pictures has worked with a variety of film directors and companies, including Ritesh Batra, Nikhil Advani, Anurag Kashyap, Sikhya Entertainment amongst others. Apart from its investments in iRock Media, DAR has also focused immensely on innovation and the adoption of modern technology, creating Haunted 3D, India's first stereoscopic 3D horror film. Further, the movies credited to DAR clearly indicate a tilt towards, content and subject driven cinema. Films like City of Gold, D-Day and The Lunchbox are stark examples of that. 
 
Amongst the most talked about and appreciated films of 2013, ‘The Lunchbox’ was not just an unprecedented success story domestically but also received phenomenal international acclaim. A Sundance script ‘The Lunchbox’ was showcased at Cannes and The Dubai International Film Festival, amongst many others. It was bestowed with the Best Screenplay and Jury Grand Prize at the Asia Pacific Screen Awards 2013.
 
Dar Motion Pictures is a Bollywood production house that actively produces both Hindi and regional cinema. Opening with the hard hitting and riveting Lalbaug Parel (Marathi) & City of Gold (2010 film)(Hindi), DAR moved on to produce many Marathi and Hindi films including and Teecha Baap Tyacha Baap (Marathi), Haunted 3D, D-Day, Mickey Virus, Peddlers, Monsoon Shootout and The Lunchbox. Further through its distribution arm, ‘DAR Film Distributors’, it has been behind the distribution of two Hollywood films in India namely, ‘The Dark Knight Rises’ and ‘Fast & Furious 6’, and released Girish Malik's ‘Jal’ which was the only Indian film in competition at the Busan International Film Festival 2013. Among other Marathi films that DAR Film Distributors have distributed are Dhag, Postcard and Cappuccino.

History
Continuing in the tradition of creating new content beyond the language barrier, DAR has given Marathi cinema its first superhero film ‘Baji’ starring Shreyas Talpade. 2017 saw the release of 2 films from the house of DAR, namely 'Haraamkhor' & 'Monsoon Shootout'. The production house's most recent Marathi release is the much talked about Bucket List, which is directed by Tejas Vijay Deoskar and bears the distinction of being the first ever Marathi film to feature the one & only Madhuri Dixit.  The film had a wide release on 25 May 2018. DAR's only release in 2019 has been acclaimed director Ritesh Batra's Photograph (film) which features Nawazuddin Siddiqui and Sanya Malhotra

Way Forward

The company also has various other projects under development currently including a remake of the Malayalam movie Bangalore Days and a biopic on Arunima Sinha - a national level volleyball player who was pushed from a running train by some robbers in 2011, before going on to become the first female amputee to climb Mount Everest. DAR has also recently forayed into the digital space, is currently in the process of setting up both web-series and original films for the leading OTT/digital platforms. The year 2020 will also see DAR officially entering into films in the Southern Indian languages.

Key people

The management team at DAR consists of the founders Arun Rangachari (also the chairman) and Vivek Rangachari, along with their COO, Sethumadhavan Napan.

Filmography

Films Produced

Films Distributed

References

External links
 DAR Motion Pictures at Bollywood Hungama
DAR Capital Group 

Film production companies based in Mumbai
Film distributors of India
Indian companies established in 2009
Mass media companies established in 2009
2009 establishments in Maharashtra